CNP may refer to:

Organizations
 California National Party, a Californian center-left political party that aims for California's secession
 Cambodian National Police, the national police force of Cambodia
 Canadian Nationalist Party, a Canadian white nationalist political party
 CenterPoint Energy, known by their ticker symbol CNP, a Fortune 500 electric and natural gas utility
 Chinese Nationalist Party (Kuomintang), a center-right political party in the Republic of China on Taiwan
 Chinese New Party, the former name of the New Party, a political party in the Republic of China on Taiwan
 CNP Assurances, a French insurance corporation
 Colombian National Police
 Cornish Nationalist Party, an unregistered political party in the U.K.
 Council for National Policy, an invite-only right-wing nonprofit network for powerful activists and politicians in the United States
 Counter Narcotics Police of Afghanistan
 Cuerpo Nacional de Policía, the Spanish police
 NPM/CNP (Compagnie Nationale à Portefeuille SA), a Belgian non-listed holding company

Science and medicine
 Certified nurse practitioner, an Advanced Practice Nurse (APN) who has completed graduate-level education
 Certified Nutritional Practitioner, a designation of holistic nutritionists who have completed a diploma program
 Calcifying Nano-particle, or Nanobacterium, a proposed class of living organisms smaller than the accepted lower limit size for life
 2',3'-Cyclic-nucleotide 3'-phosphodiesterase, a myelin-associated enzyme that makes up 4% of total CNS myelin protein
 Chronic nonbacterial prostatitis, a pelvic pain condition affecting men
 c-type Natriuretic Peptide, a vasoactive hormone

Technology
 Certified Network Professional program of the Network Professional Association for computer network workers
 Cloud Native Processor, a microprocessor designed for use in the cloud
 Communication Network Provider, within aviation standards from ICAO and Radio Technical Commission for Aeronautics
 Nerlerit Inaat Airport (IATA airport code), on Jameson Land, Greenland
 The UK National Rail code for Conway Park railway station, Merseyside
 Contract Net Protocol, a task-sharing protocol in multi-agent systems

Other uses
 Card not present transaction, with a credit card
 Certified Nonprofit Professional, a professional designation in the United States
 cNp, the symbol for centineper, a submultiple of the neper, a logarithmic unit of ratio
 CnP, an abbreviation for Clinch 'n' Pound, a clinch fighting tactic
 Short form for Copy and paste, like c&p or c'n'p
 Chief of Naval Personnel, a position in the United States Navy responsible for overall manpower readiness
 Comprehensive National Power, an index of state power used by the People's Republic of China
 Personal Numeric Code (Romania), the national identification number in Romania